Roope Hämäläinen (born August 18, 1992) is a Finnish retired professional ice hockey player. During a career which spanned from 2009 to 2019, he played in the Liiga with SaiPa and in the Mestis with Mikkelin Jukurit and Jokipojat.

Hämäläinen made his Liiga debut playing with SaiPa during the 2009–10 SM-liiga season.

References

External links

1992 births
Living people
Finnish ice hockey centres
People from Lappeenranta
Jokipojat players
Mikkelin Jukurit players
SaiPa players
Sportspeople from South Karelia